Steven A. Schroeder is Distinguished Professor of Health and Health Care at the University of California, San Francisco (UCSF), where he also heads the Smoking Cessation Leadership Center. He served as the president and CEO of the Robert Wood Johnson Foundation from 1990 to 2002. Schroeder is known for his work in promoting smoking cessation strategies.

Early life and education 

Steven A. Schroeder was born in Staten Island, NY.  He graduated from Stanford University in 1960 and entered Harvard Medical School, earning an M.D. in 1964. He trained in internal medicine at the Harvard Medical Service of Boston City Hospital. He then became an officer of the Epidemiological Intelligence Service of the Centers for Disease Control and held faculty appointments at Harvard and George Washington University. In 1976 UCSF Chair of Medicine, Lloyd “Holly” Smith, recruited Dr. Schroeder to the faculty, where he created the Division of General Internal Medicine (1980). He recruited a talented group of junior faculty, many of whom are still at UCSF.
 
Also in 1976 Schroeder became part of the core faculty in the Health Policy Program at UCSF, a program that evolved into a national Health Services Policy Analysis Center (1977). In 1981 it was renamed the UCSF Institute for Health Policy Studies (now the Philip R. Lee Institute for Health Policy Studies) and designated an Organized Research Unit by the UC Regents. In addition to his work in the Division of General Medicine, Dr. Schroeder published widely in health services research, often in collaboration with Jonathan Showstack, Ph.D., M.P.H.

Schroeder has been married to Sally Ross Schroeder for 51 years. They have two physicians sons and four grandchildren.

Honors 
Schroeder's honors include 6 honorary doctoral degrees, the Lienhard Award from the National Academy of Medicine, and the Rogers Award from the American Association of American Medical Colleges. The American Legacy Foundation (now known as Truth Institute) named its National Institute for Tobacco Policy Studies in his honor in 2006, and the Leapfrog Group and the organization Costs of Care in 2018 inaugurated the Schroeder Award for Outstanding Health Care CEO. He gave the 2007 Shattuck Lecture for the Massachusetts Medical Society and the New England Journal of Medicine.

Memberships and societies 

Schroeder is a member of the American Academy of Arts and Sciences, American Association of Physicians, American College of Physicians, American Public Health Association, the National Academy of Medicine, and the Society of General Internal Medicine, as well as other organizations.

Special national committees and offices 

Schroeder was president of the Society for General Internal Medicine and the Harvard Medical Alumni Association in 2003–2006.  He has been a part of many academic review boards, including those at NYU, Penn, U. Vermont, U Wisconsin, UC Berkeley, and UCSF.

Journal editorial boards and directorships 

Schroeder was a member of the editorial board of the New England Journal of Medicine from 1994 to 2013. His directorships include the vice chair (2001–2003) and chair (2003–2005) of the American Legacy Foundation (now Truth Initiative), Board of Overseers of Harvard College from 2000 to 2006, The James Irvine Foundation from 2004 to 2015, Mathematica Policy Research from 2011 onward, and the Marin Community Foundation.

Robert Wood Johnson Foundation 

From 1990 to 2002, Steven Schroeder left UCSF to become president and CEO of the Robert Wood Johnson Foundation. During his tenure at RWJF, it made over four billion dollars in grants and developed new programs in substance abuse, prevention and treatment; programs in end of life care; and the expansion of health insurance for children.

Smoking Cessation Leadership Center 

In 2003 Schroeder returned to UCSF. He serves as Distinguished Professor of Health and Health Care in the Department of Medicine. He heads the Smoking Cessation Leadership Center (SCLC), a program designed to work with health professionals and organizations to "narrow the gap between what should be done to help smokers quit, and what is currently done."  A major project of the SCLC has been to mainstream smoking cessation treatments among populations victimized by smoking – those with mental health illnesses and substance use disorders.

References 
Smoking Cessation Leadership Center

Further reading - Schroeder et al
  
 

  

Year of birth missing (living people)
Living people
University of California, San Francisco faculty
University of California, San Francisco alumni
Harvard Medical School alumni
Stanford University alumni
Harvard University faculty
George Washington University faculty
American health care chief executives
Members of the National Academy of Medicine